University of Saint Francis or Saint Francis College may refer to:

St. Francis College, in Brooklyn Heights, New York
St. Francis' College, in Lucknow, India
Saint Francis University, in Loretto, Pennsylvania
University of St. Francis, in Joliet, Illinois
University of Saint Francis (Indiana), in Fort Wayne, Indiana
University of San Francisco, in San Francisco, California

See also
 Saint Francis (disambiguation)